Oorkavalan is a 1987 Indian Tamil-language action drama film directed by Manobala, starring Rajinikanth and Raadhika. The film did average business in box-office.

Plot 
The story describes the struggle of a young villager Kangeyan to receive justice for his brother's murder. Manickam falls in love with Mallika, the daughter of Pannaiar. Mallika's marriage is arranged with Dorai, but she refuses and declares her love for Mannikam. Kangeyan gets them married in the village. The priest pretends to have divine powers and uses the superstitious beliefs of the villagers to kill Manickam. Kangeyan, not wanting to see Mallika as a widow, decides to get her married again to Pandian, a cart driver who was her childhood friend. Dorai intervenes again proceeding to use superstition again and Kangeyan learns about truth behind his brother's death exposing the priest and Dorai losing his lover in the process.

Cast 
Rajinikanth as Kangeyan
Raadhika as Vadivu
Pandiyan as Pandiyan
Raghuvaran as Rajadurai
Sangili Murugan as Swami
Malaysia Vasudevan as President
Manoj Krishna as Manickam (Kangeyan's brother)
Vennira Aadai Moorthy as Kannukku Pillai
Y. G. Mahendran as Rajadurai's friend
Chithra as Mallika
Kumarimuthu as Kangeyan's friend
Sethu Vinayagam
S. N. Parvathy

Soundtrack 
The music was composed by Shankar–Ganesh.

Release and reception 
Oorkavalan was released on 4 September 1987. N. Krishnaswamy of The Indian Express wrote, "Some of the characters get a lifelike quality because of good performances and a helpful screenplay."

References

External links 
 

1980s action drama films
1980s Tamil-language films
1987 films
Films about superstition
Films directed by Manobala
Films scored by Shankar–Ganesh
Indian action drama films